Guanzhou Station is a station of Line 4 of the Guangzhou Metro. It started operations on 26 December 2005. It is located at the underground of the central part of Guanzhou Island in Haizhu District. It was constructed to cope with the Guangzhou International Biological Island", a science and technology development zone led by biological industry that opened in 2011.

Before the station opened, no land transport was provided between Guanzhou Island and Guangzhou urban. Only ships were available to provide the transport service for the island.

Station layout

Exits

References

Railway stations in China opened in 2005
Guangzhou Metro stations in Haizhu District